Fuscidea texana is a species of saxicolous (rock-dwelling), crustose lichen in the family Fuscideaceae. Found in the United States, it was formally described as a new species in 2008 by lichenologist Alan Fryday. Its ascospores are thick-walled and measure 8–9 by 4.5–5.5 μm. The lichen contains norstictic acid, a secondary compound. Fuscidea texana is only known from the original type collection, dating from 1970. The specific epithet refers to its type locality.

References

Umbilicariales
Lichen species
Lichens described in 2008
Lichens of the South-Central United States
Fungi without expected TNC conservation status